Anke Kaysser-Pyzella (born 26 September 1966) is a German materials scientist and mechanical engineer who has been the CEO of the German Aerospace Center since October 2020. She had previously served as the President of the Technical University of Braunschweig from 2017 until 2020.

Early life and education
Kaysser-Pyzalla received her doctoral degree from Ruhr University Bochum.

Other activities
 Fraport, Member of the Economic Advisory Board

References 

German mechanical engineers
German materials scientists
Ruhr University Bochum alumni

1966 births

Living people